La vida entera (English title: For a lifetime) is a Venezuelan telenovela written by Leonardo Padrón and produced by Venevisión.

Production officially began in September 2008. On March 9, 2009, Venevisión began airing La vida entera at 9:00 pm, replacing ¿Vieja yo?. The finale was aired on May 12, 2009, with Los misterios del amor replacing it the following day. Univision aired La vida entera from April 5, 2010, at 6:00 pm.

Anastasia Mazzone and Jorge Reyes star as the protagonists while Marlene De Andrade stars as the antagonist. Carlos Montilla, Carlos Mata, Beatriz Valdés and Gustavo Rodríguez starred as stellar performances.

Plot
Julieta Torres, known by her friends as 'Kotufa' (popcorn), is a social communication university student who is required to submit a thesis project on her favorite journalist. She approaches Salvador Duque, a handsome and intelligent journalist, who she admires a lot. Salvador works in Brazil and is only in Venezuela for a couple of days for a family party, when he meets Julieta. He shortly starts working at his father's newspaper. But the Duque Family also runs a women's magazine publication titled "Exquisita" . With time, the two fall in love with each other as they interact over their love of journalism and magazine publication.

Their growing love becomes complicated when Salvador's uncle, Cristóbal Duque also falls in love with Julieta. Cristóbal and Julieta meet the same day Salvador and Julieta meet. Julieta crashes Cristobal's car, where Cristobal falls in love with Julieta. Cristobal makes up things and follows Julieta so he could see her. Laly Falcón who is Salvador's girlfriend, does everything to separate the two lovers. Laly is an ambitious executive who wants to keep Salvador at her side in order to utilise his family's influence in the publishing business, especially considering that Salvador's father Napoleón Duque is a dominant figure in the publishing industry while his strict and demanding mother Olimpia is the editor-in-chief of the magazine where Julieta begins to work as an intern.

La vida entera explores the complex personal and professional relationships developed in workplace while looking at the intrigues and romances that surround the publishing business.

Cast

Main 
 Anastasia Mazzone as Julieta Torres “Cotufa”
 Jorge Reyes as Salvador Duque
 Carlos Montilla as Cristóbal Duque
 Marlene De Andradeas Laly Falcón
 Carlos Mata as Facundo Montoya
 Beatriz Valdés as Olimpia Duque
 Gustavo Rodríguez as Napoleón Duque

Also Main 

 Crisol Carabal as Titina San Juan
 Carlos Cruz as Próspero Bermúdez
 Gledys Ibarra as Pasión Guerra
 Marisa Román as Carlota Duque “Tata”
 Roque Valero as Miki Mata
 Luis Gerónimo Abreu as Guillermo Maduro
 Tania Sarabia as Primitiva
 Lourdes Valera as Rosa Coronel†
 Héctor Manrique as Licenciado Merchán
 Daniela Bascopé as Natalia Montoya
 Henry Soto as Segundo Durán
 Roberto Lamarca as Tamanaco
 Beatriz Vázquez as Luz Mediante
 Basilio Alvarez as Philip Adelso Centeno
 Paula Woyzechowzky as Perla Reyes
 Mariaca Semprum as Mariví
 Adolfo Cubas as Javier
 Andreína Yépez as Tesoro
 Adriana Romero as Lupe
 Alejandro Corona as Canelón
 Pedro Durán
 Paula Beivilacqua as Vilma Trocónis
 Iván Romero as Severino
 Fernando Villate as Máximo Cuenca
 Cristóbal Lander as Gustavo
 Yina Vélez as Clarita
 Ligia Duarte
 Anna Massimo
 Elba Escobar as Cordelia
 Daniela Maya as Lucía Durán
 Cesar D' La Torre as Juancito
 Carlos Dagama as Daniel Torres

References

External links
 

Venevisión telenovelas
2008 telenovelas
Venezuelan telenovelas
2008 Venezuelan television series debuts
2009 Venezuelan television series endings
Spanish-language telenovelas
Television shows set in Caracas